

Osa Wildlife Sanctuary 
The Osa Wildlife Sanctuary or Caña Blanca Wildlife Sanctuary, is an animal rescue center located in Osa Peninsula in southwestern Costa Rica. The Sanctuary is accessible only by boat and is completely surrounded by Piedras Blancas National Park. The center is dedicated to the rehabilitation of mistreated, injured, orphaned, and/or confiscated animals. The animals that are received by the sanctuary include  a variety of monkeys, anteaters, exotic birds, sloths, and wildcats. Once the animals are fully rehabilitated, they are reintroduced into their natural habitats in protected areas within Costa Rica, including the Corcovado National Park. The Osa Wildlife Sanctuary is a nonprofit organization that receives funds from volunteers, donations, and tours.

History 
The Osa Wildlife Sanctuary was originally a eco-lodge owned by a woman named Carol Patrick, its purpose being to house guests. While Carol was running the eco-lodge she was asked by locals to take care of injured and abandoned animals. After accepting a few at first, the animals under her care continued to grow, until in 2003 she opened up the wildlife sanctuary. The property has continued to develop towards animal care and release since then, the once eco-lodge has now been developed to include animal enclosures and housing and dining for the staff.

See also 
 List of zoos by country: Costa Rica zoos

References 

Animal reintroduction
Wildlife rehabilitation and conservation centers
Tourist attractions in Puntarenas Province
Zoos in Costa Rica
2003 establishments in Costa Rica